The Paul Laurence Dunbar School (also known as the Dunbar Community School) is a historic school in Fort Myers, Florida. It is located at 1857 High Street. On February 24, 1992, it was added to the U.S. National Register of Historic Places.

References

External links

 Lee County listings at National Register of Historic Places
 Florida's Office of Cultural and Historical Programs
 Lee County listings
 Dunbar Community School

National Register of Historic Places in Lee County, Florida
Education in Fort Myers, Florida
Buildings and structures in Fort Myers, Florida